(-‡2002 to 2005) served as the Deputy National Commissioner and Deputy International Commissioner of the Scout Association of Japan.

Imada was a Varsity Scout, a Keio University graduate, and a member of Keio Scout Mita-kai alumni association.

In 2004, Imada was awarded the 300th Bronze Wolf, the only distinction of the World Organization of the Scout Movement, awarded by the World Scout Committee for exceptional services to world Scouting.

References

External links

https://web.archive.org/web/20131014183020/http://www5.airnet.ne.jp/bsy87/Y87eng/eNews/08_BRZ/eY87_2008_brz_01a.html

Full list of Japanese Bronze Wolf recipients
http://www.geocities.jp/bskano/amitukisawa.htm

Recipients of the Bronze Wolf Award
Year of birth missing
Year of death missing
Scouting in Japan